Tadeusz Janczenko (born 9 January 1946) is a Polish athlete. He competed in the men's decathlon at the 1972 Summer Olympics.

References

1946 births
Living people
Athletes (track and field) at the 1972 Summer Olympics
Polish decathletes
Olympic athletes of Poland
People from Świebodzin